Suzette Marie Raines is an American politician and a former Republican member of the West Virginia House of Delegates having represented District 35 from January 12, 2013 until December 1, 2014. Raines won the primary for the 2014 House of Delegates election, however she would later drop out from the race due to allegations from the Democratic Party as well as other personal reasons, and as a result her name was replaced on the ballot.

Elections
2012 With the redistricting of District 35, Raines ran in the ten-way May 8, 2012 Republican Primary and placed second with 2,561 votes (18.2%), and placed second in the eight-way four-position November 6, 2012 General election with 13,676 votes (14.5%), behind incumbent Democratic Representative Doug Skaff, ahead of fellow Republican selectees Eric Nelson and John McCuskey, and non-selectees incumbent Democratic Representatives Bobbie Hatfield and Bonnie Brown, Democratic nominee Chris Morris, and fellow Republican nominee Fred Joseph.

References

External links
Official page at the West Virginia Legislature
Campaign site

Suzette Raines at Ballotpedia
Suzette Raines at the National Institute on Money in State Politics

Place of birth missing (living people)
Year of birth missing (living people)
Living people
Republican Party members of the West Virginia House of Delegates
People from Kanawha County, West Virginia
Women state legislators in West Virginia
21st-century American women